Outrage is a 1998 American made-for-television thriller drama film and a remake of the 1973 film of the same name. It originally aired on ABC on Sunday, January 4, 1998.

Tagline
The film's tagline was "They trashed his car, his house, his life, then they went a little too far".

Plot
A father-to-be and his pregnant wife become the targets of a revenge campaign after the man reports the criminal activities of a trio of wealthy teens to the police.

Cast
 Rob Lowe as Tom Casey
 Jennifer Grey as Sally Casey
 Kathryn Harrold as Deena Bateman
 Eric Michael Cole as Jeffrey Bateman
 Shane Meier as Mark
 Cyrus Thiedeke as Fats

References

External links
 
 
 

1998 television films
1998 films
1990s thriller drama films
American thriller drama films
American films about revenge
ABC network original films
Films directed by Robert Allan Ackerman
Films scored by David Mansfield
American drama television films
1990s American films